The 1793 Pennsylvania gubernatorial election occurred on November 5, 1793. Incumbent Democratic-Republican governor Thomas Mifflin sought re-election to another term, defeating Federalist candidate and U.S. Representative Frederick Muhlenberg. Muhlenberg only won two counties: York and Bedford. However, Mifflin's 2-1 vote margin was down from his 10-1 victory margin in the 1790 gubernatorial election.

Results

References

1793
Pennsylvania
Gubernatorial